The Serbian Hockey League Season for 1995-1996 was the fifth season of the league. Four teams participated, each one playing four games with one another, resulting in twelve games for each team. KHK Crvenza Zvezda won all the games that it played that season, resulting in them winning the regular division. They went on to win the playoffs.

Teams
HK Partizan
KHK Crvena Zvezda
HK Vojvodina
HK Spartak Subotica

Regular season standings

Playoffs

Semifinals
Crvena Zvezda defeated Spartak in a series. 13-1 5-0
HK Vojvodina defeated Partizan in a series. 6-3 8-3

Finals
Red Star swept Vojvodina in the finals.
Game 1 - 4-2
Game 2 - 7-4
Game 3 - 12-2

third place
Spartak and Partizan were supposed to pay in the finals. However they did not participate, and spartak won by default.

cup competition
There was also the competition for the cup. In it Red Star beat Vojvodina 9-3 to win it.

Serbian Hockey League
Serbian Hockey League seasons
Serb